Hyōga Ōta (born 9 December 1997) is a Japanese judoka.

He is the gold medallist of the 2018 Judo Grand Slam Ekaterinburg in the +100 kg category.

References

External links
 
 

1997 births
Living people
Japanese male judoka
21st-century Japanese people